The grave accent ( or ) is a diacritical mark used to varying degrees in French, Dutch, Portuguese, Italian and many other western European languages, as well as for a few unusual uses in English. It is also used in other languages using the Latin alphabet, such as Mohawk and Yoruba, and with non-Latin writing systems such as the Greek and Cyrillic alphabets and the Bopomofo or Zhuyin Fuhao semi-syllabary. It has no single meaning, but can indicate pitch, stress, or other features.

For the most commonly encountered uses of the accent in the Latin and Greek alphabets, precomposed characters are available. For less-used and compound diacritics, a combining character facility is available. A free-standing version of the symbol, commonly called a backtick, also exists and has acquired other uses.

Uses

Pitch

The grave accent first appeared in the polytonic orthography of Ancient Greek to mark a lower pitch than the high pitch of the acute accent. In modern practice, it replaces an acute accent in the last syllable of a word when that word is followed immediately by another word. The grave and circumflex have been replaced with an acute accent in the modern monotonic orthography.

The accent mark was called , the feminine form of the adjective , meaning "heavy" or "low in pitch."

Stress
The grave accent marks the stressed vowels of words in Maltese, Catalan, and Italian.

Words that end with stressed  or  may bear either an acute accent or a grave accent, depending on whether the final e or o sound is closed or open, respectively. Typists who use a keyboard without accented characters and are unfamiliar with input methods for typing accented letters sometimes use a separate grave accent or even an apostrophe instead of the proper accent character.

While the stress is not marked most of the time a notable exception is the single-vowel word : without an accent it denotes the "and" conjunction (рокля и пола = dress and skirt) while stressed shows the possessive pronoun "her" (роклята ѝ = her dress). Hence the rule to always mark the stress in this isolated case.

In Macedonian the stress mark is orthographically required to distinguish homographs (see ) and is put mostly on the vowels е and и. Then, it forces the stress on the accented word-syllable instead of having a different syllable in the stress group getting accented. In turn, it changes the pronunciation and the whole meaning of the group.

Ukrainian, Rusyn, Belarusian, and Russian used a similar system until the first half of the 20th century. Now the main stress is preferably marked with an acute, and the role of the grave is limited to marking secondary stress in compound words (in dictionaries and linguistic literature).

In Croatian, Serbian, and Slovene, the stressed syllable can be short or long and have a rising or falling tone. They use (in dictionaries, orthography, and grammar books, for example) four different stress marks (grave, acute, double grave, and inverted breve) on the letters a, e, i, o, r, and u: à è ì ò r̀ ù. The system is identical in both Latin and Cyrillic scripts. Unicode forgot to encode R-grave when encoding the letters with stress marks.

In modern Church Slavonic, there are three stress marks (acute, grave, and circumflex), which formerly represented different types of pitch accent. There is no longer any phonetic distinction between them, only an orthographical one. The grave is typically used when the stressed vowel is the last letter of a multiletter word.

Height
The grave accent marks the height or openness of the vowels e and o, indicating that they are pronounced open: è  (as opposed to é ); ò  (as opposed to ó ), in several Romance languages:
 Catalan uses the accent on three letters (and ).
 French orthography uses the accent on three letters (and ).
 The  is used in only one word,  ("where"), to distinguish it from its homophone  ("or").
 Italian
 Occitan

Disambiguation 
In several languages, the grave accent distinguishes both homophones and words that otherwise would be homographs:
 In Bulgarian and Macedonian, it distinguishes the conjunction  ("and") from the short-form feminine possessive pronoun .
 In Italian, it distinguishes, for example, the feminine article  from the adverb  ("there").
Popular usage, possibly because Norwegian rarely uses diacritics, often leads to a grave accent in place of an acute accent.
It also marks distinctions of stress ( "already" vs.  "violin") and of vowel quality ( "bed" vs.  "marriage").

Length
In Welsh, the accent denotes a short vowel sound in a word that would otherwise be pronounced with a long vowel sound:   "mug" versus   "smoke".

The use of acute accents to denote the rarer close long vowels, leaving the grave accents for the open long ones, is seen in older texts, but it is no longer allowed according to the new orthographical conventions.

Tone
In some tonal languages such as Vietnamese, and Mandarin Chinese (when it is written in Hanyu Pinyin or Zhuyin Fuhao), the grave accent indicates a falling tone. The alternative to the grave accent in Mandarin is the numeral 4 after the syllable: pà = pa4.

In African languages and in International Phonetic Alphabet, the grave accent often indicates a low tone: Nobiin jàkkàr ("fish-hook"), Yoruba àgbọ̀n ("chin"), Hausa màcè ("woman").

The grave accent represents the low tone in Kanien'kéha or Mohawk.

Other uses
In Emilian-Romagnol, a grave accent placed over e or o denotes both length and openness.

In Portuguese, the grave accent indicates the contraction of two consecutive vowels in adjacent words (crasis). For example, instead of a aquela hora ("at that hour"), one says and writes àquela hora.

In Hawaiian, the grave accent is not placed over another character but is sometimes encountered as a typographically easier substitute for the ʻokina: Hawai`i instead of Hawaiʻi.

English
The grave accent, though rare in English words, sometimes appears in poetry and song lyrics to indicate that a usually silent vowel is pronounced to fit the rhythm or meter. Most often, it is applied to a word that ends with -ed. For instance, the word looked is usually pronounced  as a single syllable, with the e silent; when written as lookèd, the e is pronounced:  look-ed). In this capacity, it can also distinguish certain pairs of identically spelled words like the past tense of learn, learned , from the adjective learnèd  (for example, "a very learnèd man").

A grave accent can also occur in a foreign (usually French) term which has not been anglicised: for example, vis-à-vis, pièce de résistance or crème brûlée. It also may occur in an English name, often as an affectation, as for example in the case of Albert Ketèlbey.

Letters with grave

Unicode

The Unicode standard makes dozens of letters with a grave accent available as precomposed characters. The older ISO-8859-1 character encoding only includes the letters à, è, ì, ò, ù, and their respective capital forms.

On British and American keyboards, the grave accent is a key by itself. This is primarily used to actually type the stand-alone character, though some layouts (such as US International or UK extended) may use it as a dead key to modify the following letter. (With these layouts, to get a character such as à, the user can type  and then the vowel. For example, to make à, the user can type  and then .) In territories where the diacritic is used routinely, the precomposed characters are provided as standard on national keyboards.

On a Mac, to get a character such as à, the user can type  and then the vowel. For example, to make à, the user can type  and then , and to make À, the user can type  and then . In iOS and most Android keyboards, combined characters with the grave accent are accessed by holding a finger on the vowel, which opens a menu for accents. Mac versions of OS X Mountain Lion (10.8) or newer share similar functionality to iOS; by pressing and holding a vowel key to open an accent menu, the user may click on the grave accented character or type the corresponding number key displayed.

References

External links

Latin-script diacritics
Greek-script diacritics
Cyrillic-script diacritics